Boeing Boeing may refer to:

 Boeing-Boeing (play), written by playwright Marc Camoletti
 Boeing Boeing (1965 film), an American film adaptation, starring Jerry Lewis and Tony Curtis
 Boeing Boeing (1985 film), a Malayalam film adaptation, directed by Priyadarshan, starring Mohanlal and Mukesh

See also
 Boing Boing, an Internet publishing entity, magazine, and group blog